Vito Francis Ananis (January 25, 1915 – September 3, 1994) was an American football halfback in the National Football League for the Washington Redskins. He played college football at Boston College.

Vito was the first child of Lithuanian immigrants, Joseph and Alice Ananis. They lived at 42b Union Street, and were members of the Immaculate Conception Catholic Church on Windsor Street. A second child, Julia, who later became known as Sally, and a son, Sigmond, who was known as Siggy, attended the Wellington School. Vito attended Rindge Technical High School where he excelled in athletics, most notably football, but also track, basketball, and hockey. Vito was recognized as an All-Scholastic football player and was considered by many as the outstanding back in the first half of the twentieth century at Rindge.

1915 births
1994 deaths
American football fullbacks
American people of Lithuanian descent
Boston College Eagles football players
Sportspeople from Cambridge, Massachusetts
Washington Redskins players